Rev. Walter Shaw, who goes by the on-air nickname Walt "Baby" Love, is a radio host in the United States.  Having been in the business for over 35 years, Walt 'Baby' Love hosted three syndicated radio programs, Gospel Traxx, The Countdown and The Urban AC Countdown. All three featured, at Love's insistence, "clean" versions of popular songs.

Biography 
Walt has been the host of three uplifting radio programs: The Countdown with Walt "Baby
Love" which aired for an unprecedented twenty nine years, from August 1982 thru August 2011;
Gospel Traxx for twenty-seven years (and still going strong); and The Urban AC Countdown
for fifteen years.

Walt was raised in the small farming community of Creighton, Pennsylvania in East Deer
Township. It was in the metropolis of Houston, Texas where he landed his big break at KYOKAM
Radio in February 1968. He went on to become the first Black on-air talent at Top
40’s powerhouse KILT radio owned by Lin Broadcasting Company.

Within four years of being in the broadcasting industry, Walt became the first Black on-air
talent at RKO radio ; hosting programs at CKLW radio in the Canadian province of Windsor,
Ontario, and WOR-FM located in New York City. During this span of his career, he also
held on-air positions at WNBC, WBLS, 99X in New York and was the first Black on-air talent
at KHJ, KMPC and KFI in Los Angeles.

In addition to these accomplishments, The Countdown with Walt "Baby” Love has
received Billboard Magazine's Best R & B Syndicated Radio Show Award five times, and has
become the longest running Urban Syndicated radio show in history. In 2001, Walt won the
Stellar Award for Best Gospel Radio Personality; In 2002 he won Radio Personality of the
Year from the Black Broadcaster's Alliance. Also in 2002, Gospel Traxx won Best
Syndicated Urban/R&B Gospel Show of the Year from Billboard Magazine.
For twenty-one years, Walt worked at Radio & Records newspaper as the Urban Radio
and Music Editor, while simultaneously hosting his syndicated radio shows.

In June 1997, Walt was ordained in the ministry and is currently an associate minister at First
African Methodist Episcopal Church in Los Angeles. In 2005, Walt received his Master of Arts in
Theology from Fuller Theological Seminary in Pasadena, California.
Walt has also started a Non-Profit Organization entitled The Walt Love Lupus and
Cancer Research Foundation, which has been functioning for over twenty years.

In 2007, Walt authored the book "The Gospel According to Reverend Walt
"Baby" Love: Inspirations and Meditations from the Gospel Radio Legend" (published by Simon
and Schuster).

In 2022, Walt "Baby" Love was inducted into the Radio Hall Of Fame.

Gospel Traxx is currently syndicated within the United States by Reach Media Inc. International syndication is handled by Radio Express.

See also 
 Wolfman Jack
 Jim Pewter
 Charlie Tuna
 John Peel
 Charlie Gillett
 R&B

References

External links
Official Web site

American radio personalities
African Methodist Episcopal Church clergy
Living people
Year of birth missing (living people)